Club Deportivo Miajadas is a Spanish football club based in Miajadas, in the autonomous community of Extremadura. Founded in 1965, it plays in Tercera División – Group 14, holding home games at Estadio Municipal de Miajadas, with a 2,500-seat capacity.

Season to season

19 seasons in Tercera División

References

External links
Futbolme team profile 
Former official website 

Football clubs in Extremadura
Association football clubs established in 1965
1965 establishments in Spain
Province of Cáceres